Arica Derris Carter (born July 19, 1996) is an American professional women's basketball player for Panathinaikos in the Greek League and, previously, winning championship success in Mexico after stints with teams in the Spanish Liga Femenina de Baloncesto  and Phoenix Mercury of the United States's Women’s National Basketball Association (WNBA).

Early life 
Carter was born in Los Angeles, USA to parents Derrick Moses and Fern Carter and has six sisters and one brother. She started her basketball career playing in high school at Long Beach Poly in Los Angeles  and was the first player from that school to be drafted and/or play in the WNBA. She later described her mother and sister as role models because "they are three strong women who keep pushing through no matter what the circumstances are".

Carter was a key member of the Long Beach Poly girls basketball team and won tournament MVP by, among the other tournament success, scoring twelve points and gaining eight steals in the final of the Inglewood City of Champions Elite Division in 2012. This was followed up with being chosen as Dream Team Player of the Year in 2013, averaging over eleven points per game, as Long Beach Poly won the California Interscholastic Federation (CIF) Division 1 championship  in a 46–28 win over Berkley including eleven points from Carter. She averaged 10.5 points, 5.1 steals and 4.3 rebounds in her final 2014 season to win her second CIF championship with the Long Beach "jackrabbits"; this time finishing champions in the Open Division with Carter scoring five in the 70–52 victory over Salesian.

Long Beach Poly's coach Carl Buggs said of Carter that ""She has a complete game, She has the ability to score, to score in crunch time, to make an assist, and she plays great defense" and that she chose to attend Louisville after high school because she saw that the players there practised hard - even when the coach was not watching them; he added that "it made me happy to be reminded that there are still players like that. She really cares about winning and about the game."

College
Carter, known as "AC", then played four years at the University of Louisville while studying for a degree in psychology before being drafted in the third round to the WNBA and from there to basketball clubs outside of her native USA.Carter played four seasons of college basketball at the University of Louisville in Louisville, Kentucky for the Cardinals. Carter was a three-year starter for the Cardinals.  She did not start in her freshman year, but played in 34 games and had a season that she later described as "a little rough" shooting zero for 15 from three point range. Her coach said that in that season she "couldn't hit the broad side of a barn." She commented that her response to the first season was to spend more and more time practising shooting in the gym and that resulted in shooting percentages of nearly forty percent at 3-point range and thirty minutes per game in later years. Carter did not play in the 2016–17 season due to a hernia, and took a medical redshirt that year, allowing her to be eligible for both the 2017–18 and 2018–19 seasons.  During this season, Carter and the Cardinals would win the ACC Tournament.  Carter also participated in three NCAA Tournaments during her time at Louisville.

In her college career she was known for her team leadership, mentoring of fellow players (including star guard Asia Durr) and quiet, unflashy but effective scoring and point-management in her role as point guard. Her coach Jeff Walz said that Carter was "just a heady, smart basketball player. AC, she just grinds it out"

Louisville statistics

Source

Career

WNBA
Carter was selected as the thirty second overall pick of the 2019 WNBA draft by the Phoenix Mercury. After making the final roster with the Mercury, Carter would play under head coach Sandy Brondello and alongside the likes of Brittney Griner, DeWanna Bonner and Diana Taurasi.  Carter played in the Mercury's first two games, totaling eight minutes of play.  Carter was then waived to make room for Leilani Mitchell on June 1, 2019.  Carter would be picked back up by the Mercury in August on a seven-day contract but left to make way for the return of Diana Taurasi.

WNBA statistics 
Source

|-
!2019
|Phoenix
|6
|0
|4.0
|.200
|.000
|–
|0.0
|0.2
|0.2
|0.0
|0.3
|0.3

Spanish league 

After a year's absence Carter joined Nissan CB Al-Qázeres Extremadura in the Spanish Liga Femenina de Baloncesto for the 2019–20 season and moved to Moviestar Estudiantes  in the same league for the 2020–21 and 2021–22 season. In her second season at Estudientes, they qualified for the 2021–22 EuroCup but were eliminated in play-off round 1 to Flammes Carolo Basket of Belgium by only three points in a two-leg match. Carter was voted best forward of the 2021–22 season of the Endesa Women's League and that year posted her career high 26 points and 8 assists in separate matches.

Mexican league 
At the conclusion of the 2021–22 season in Spain, Carter switched to Mexican club Astros de Jalisco in the first season of the Liga Nacional de Baloncesto Profesional Femenil (LNBPF) where she was chosen as MVP of the grand final series for her contribution in winning the Mexican championship for Astros. They were losing the final series 2-3 when they travelled to the home court of opponents Adelitas of Chihuahua but won the final two games to clinch the championship. Astros were 20 points behind the second last match but Carter posted 31 points and 6 assists to square the series with a 73-67 victory.  Carter took 23 points and 7 assists in her 37 minutes on the court in the final championship match to win the title by 69 points to 64.

Spanish and Mexican statistics

Greek League 
On June 29, 2022, she was announced by the Greek club Panathinaikos.

References

External links
 
 Louisville Cardinals bio

1996 births
Living people
American women's basketball players
Basketball players from Los Angeles
Guards (basketball)
Louisville Cardinals women's basketball players
Panathinaikos WBC players
Phoenix Mercury draft picks
Phoenix Mercury players